Holan (also Romanized as Holān) is a village in Azghan Rural District, in the Central District of Ahar County, East Azerbaijan Province, Iran. At the 2006 census, its population was 51, in 12 families.

References 

Populated places in Ahar County